Šaleta Kordić (born 19 April 1993) is a Montenegrin football striker.

Club career
Born in Kotor, he played with the youth team of Grbalj where he played during the 2009-10 Montenegrin youth championship. After that season Vojvodina brought Šaleta to its youth team along with his brother Marko. During the winter break of the season 2011-12 he was promoted to the first team. In summer 2012 he was loaned to Montenegrin First League side Mladost Podgorica.

After playing half a season in the First Macedonian Football League with Euromilk Gorno Lisiče, in summer 2014 he returned to Serbia this time to play with second tier side BSK Borča. On 5 June 2015, he returned to Vojvodina, signing a 3-year deal with the club. However, only few weeks later Šaleta terminated his contract with Vojvodina, and signed for Sutjeska Nikšić. After only one season, Kordić started his third spell at Vojvodina, signing a -year deal. However, only two months later, the contract was mutually terminated, and Kordić signed a one-year-deal with Montenegrin side Zeta.

In June 2021, he signed with Russian club Chayka Peschanokopskoye. On 2 July 2021, Russian Football Union decided to relegate Chayka from second-tier FNL back to the third-tier PFL for the 2021–22 season for fixing games in the 2018–19 season. As foreign players are not allowed to play in the PFL, that meant a release from his contract with Chayka.

International career
Šaleta Kordić has been part of the U-17 and U-19 Montenegrin national teams.

In May 2016 he was part of Montenegro "B" team.

He made his national team debut on 7 October 2020 in a friendly against Latvia.

References

External sources
 

1993 births
Living people
People from Kotor
Association football forwards
Montenegrin footballers
Montenegro youth international footballers
Montenegro international footballers
FK Vojvodina players
OFK Titograd players
RFK Novi Sad 1921 players
OFK Grbalj players
FK Gorno Lisiče players
FK BSK Borča players
FK Sutjeska Nikšić players
FK Zeta players
FK Podgorica players
Serbian SuperLiga players
Montenegrin First League players
Serbian First League players
Macedonian First Football League players
Montenegrin expatriate footballers
Expatriate footballers in Serbia
Montenegrin expatriate sportspeople in Serbia
Expatriate footballers in North Macedonia
Montenegrin expatriate sportspeople in North Macedonia